Narayan (26 September 1940 – 16 August 2022) was an Indian author best known for his debut novel Kocharethi (1998). Most of Narayan's novels deal with the lives of the tribal communities of Kerala. He belonged to the Malayarayar tribe and is considered Kerala's first tribal novelist.

Early life
Narayan who was born in 1940 in Kudayathur, Idukki district, belonged to the tribe called Malayarayar. After completing his schooling from a local government school, he got a job in the postal service.

Literary career

Narayan started his literary career by writing a few short stories, which were published in periodicals. The writing did not attract the attention of readers but it did attract attention of the negative sort: of his immediate superior. With the publication of his debut novel Kocharethi in 1998, Narayan became Kerala's first tribal novelist. The novel, through the lives of its protagonist Kunjipennu and her childhood love and later husband, Kochuraman, depicts the history, traditions and travails of the Malayarayar tribal community in Kerala in the twentieth century. While Narayan completed the manuscript of the novel in 1988, it was published only ten years later by the DC Books. The novel was critically acclaimed and went on to win the Kerala Sahitya Akademi Award. Its English translation as Kocharethi: The Araya Woman by Catherine Thankamma was published by the Oxford University Press in 2011 and won the Economist Crossword Book Award in the Indian language translation category for 2011.

Awards and recognitions
Kocharethi was given the Kerala Sahitya Akademi Award in the Novel category for the year 1999. The novel's English translation by Catherine Thankamma won the Economist Crossword Book Award in 2011. Narayan is also a recipient of many other awards including Thoppil Ravi Award and Abu Dhabi Sakthi Award.

Kocharethi has run into six editions in Malayalam and has been translated into Hindi as Pahadin and into all the south Indian languages. A French translation of the novel is also in progress.

Death 
Narayan died with COVID-19 on 16 August 2022, at the age of 81.

Works
Novels
Kocharethi – (1998)
Ooralikkudi – (1999)
Chengarum Kuttalum – (2001)
Vandanam – (2003)
Tholkkunnavar Aaraanur – (2006)
Ee Vazhiyil Aalere Illa – (2006)
Thiraskrutharude Nalea – (2010)
Manasum Dhehavum Kondu Njan Ninnea – (2010)
Pennungal Paniyunna Nagaram – (2016)
Vannalakal – (2016)
Ee Vazhiyil Aalereyilla – (2016)

Short Story Collections
Nissahayante Nilavili – (2006)
Pela Marutha – (2006)
Kadhakal Narayan – (2011)
Narayante Theranjedutha Kadhakal – (2012)
Narayante Kadhakal – (2013)

List of awards
 Thoppil Ravi Foundation Award – (1999)
 Kerala Sahitya Akademi Award for Novel – (1999, for Kocharethi)
 Abu Dhabi Sakthi Award – (1999, for Kocharethi)
Swami Ananda Theertha Award – (2011)
Economist Crossword Book Award – (2011)

References

External links

 Excerpts from the OUP translation

 

 Narayan Books

1940 births
2022 deaths
Malayali people
Malayalam-language writers
Malayalam novelists
Malayalam short story writers
Recipients of the Kerala Sahitya Akademi Award
20th-century Indian short story writers
Indian male novelists
Indian male short story writers
People from Idukki district
Novelists from Kerala
20th-century Indian novelists
20th-century Indian male writers
Deaths from the COVID-19 pandemic in India